Jesse Randall Baxter, Jr. (December 8, 1887 – January 29, 1960), known professionally as J.R. Baxter and sometimes referred to as "Pap", was an American Southern Gospel composer and publisher.

Biography
He was born on December 8, 1887, in Lebanon, Alabama. He was a farmer and married Clarice Howard in 1918.

He studied with Thomas B. Mosley and Anthony Johnson Showalter, and in 1926 bought a stake in Virgil O. Stamps' gospel music publishing company. The Stamps-Baxter Music & Printing Company became one of the leading publishers of gospel songs in the early 20th century. Baxter ran the company's Chattanooga, Tennessee, office until Stamps's death in 1940; following this Baxter moved to Dallas, Texas, to run the main office.

Baxter's interest in school teaching led him to publish shape-note songbooks and sponsor a Stamps-Baxter School of Music, both of which contributed to the popularity of Gospel music.

Baxter also composed Gospel songs himself; his works include "Try Jesus", "Travel the Sunlit Way", "Something Happens (When You Give Your Heart to God)", "I Have Peace in My Soul", "Living Grace", and "I Want to Help Some Weary Pilgrim".

He died on January 29, 1960, in Dallas, Texas.

Legacy
After Baxter's death, his wife continued to run the business until she died, after which it was sold to Zondervan.   In 1997, Baxter was inducted into the Southern Gospel Music Association Hall of Fame.

Footnotes

References
Ivan M. Tribe, J.R. Baxter. Encyclopedia of American Gospel Music. Routledge, 2005, p. 32.
J.R. Baxter, Southern Gospel Music Association

1887 births
1960 deaths
American gospel singers
American music publishers (people)
Composers of Christian music
20th-century American singers